Phyllomedusa iheringii is a species of frog in the subfamily Phyllomedusinae. It is found in southernmost Brazil (Rio Grande do Sul) and Uruguay. The specific name iheringii honors Hermann von Ihering, a German-Brazilian zoologist. However, common name southern walking leaf frog has been proposed for it.

It is arboreal. The eggs are laid on vegetation above standing water where the tadpoles develop. Phyllomedusa iheringii is common in parts of its range. It might be threatened by pet trade and habitat loss through conversion of native habitat to pastures. It might be present in the Lagoa do Peixe National Park (Brazil).

References

iheringii
Amphibians of Brazil
Amphibians of Uruguay
Taxa named by George Albert Boulenger
Amphibians described in 1885
Taxonomy articles created by Polbot